(?–824) was a Buddhist monk in Nara Japan of the Kegon sect, and pupil of Roben.  In his later years, Jitchu oversaw the expansion of Tōdai-ji temple, and introduced liturgy and rituals still used today.  The most noteworthy of these ceremonies is the Shuni-e repentance ceremony established by Jitchu at the request of Empress Kōmyō, wife of Emperor Shōmu, who hoped to heal the ailing Emperor.

References
 
 , Retrieved 2009-06-13

Japanese Buddhist clergy
Nara period Buddhist clergy
Kegon Buddhists